Und-raja-varam is a village in East Godavari district of the Indian state of Andhra Pradesh.It lies roughly 7 km to Tanuku. It comes under the Nidadavolu constituency for assembly elections and Rajamahendri constituency for parliamentary elections. The nearest railway station is Tanuku located at a distance of 15Km.

References

Villages in East Godavari district